The 1984–85 FIRA Trophy was the 25th edition of a European rugby union championship for national teams.

The tournament was won by France, with a Grand Slam, finishing ahead of Soviet Union and Italy.

Romania could not make "Top 3" for very first time ever, due to inferior points difference in head-to-head games with Soviet Union and Italy.

As it was initially agreed, Division 1 would be shrunk to 5 teams for next edition. That's why Spain and Tunisia which finished as 5th and 6th, were relegated and replaced by Portugal which won the Second Division and got promoted.

Subsequently, at FIRA Annual Congress, held in mid-June, it was decided to continue with 6 teams, and the two relegated teams met for a barrage game at neutral venue to decide the survivor, with the Tunisians winning.

First division 

Barrage per survival:

 Spain relegated to division 2

Second division 

Portugal promoted to division 1

Third division

Bibliography 
 Francesco Volpe, Valerio Vecchiarelli (2000), 2000 Italia in Meta, Storia della nazionale italiana di rugby dagli albori al Sei Nazioni, GS Editore (2000) .
 Francesco Volpe, Paolo Pacitti (Author), Rugby 2000, GTE Gruppo Editorale (1999).
 ქართული რაგბის მატიანე (Georgian Rugby History) 1959-2009  Free download

References

External links
1984-85 FIRA Trophy at ESPN
Albo d'Oro from Italian (FIR) Annual 2020

1984–85 in European rugby union
1984-85
1985 rugby union tournaments for national teams
1984 rugby union tournaments for national teams